Young Place is a historic farmhouse in Due West, Abbeville County, South Carolina. It was the home of Reverend J.N. Young, a religious leader, teacher, and one of the founders of nearby Erskine College. The house was listed on the National Register of Historic Places.

Architecture
Constructed around 1839, the farmhouse was remodeled after the Civil War into two stories, much along the lines of the Tuscan architecture. Exterior features include a cross gable roof and a square tower with a bracketed hipped roof.

References

National Register of Historic Places in Abbeville County, South Carolina
Georgian architecture in South Carolina
Italianate architecture in South Carolina
Houses completed in 1839
Houses on the National Register of Historic Places in South Carolina
Houses in Abbeville County, South Carolina